Omer Huyse (22 August 1898 in Kortrijk – 2 March 1985 in Luingne) was a Belgian professional road bicycle racer.
In 1924, he won stage five of the 1924 Tour de France. In that year, the cyclists were divided in three classes: the first class for top cyclists, the second class for lesser cyclists, and the touriste-routier class for semi-amateur cyclists. Huyse was put in the second class cyclists, so his stage victory was extra special.

Major results

1923
Tour of Belgium for amateurs
Amsterdam
1924
Tour de France:
Winner stage 5

External links 

Official Tour de France results for Omer Huyse

Belgian male cyclists
1898 births
1985 deaths
Belgian Tour de France stage winners
Sportspeople from Kortrijk
Cyclists from West Flanders